Scopula violacea is a moth of the  family Geometridae. It is found in India (Sikkim).

References

Moths described in 1897
violacea
Moths of Asia